A cult brand is a symbol-intensive brand usually tied to a single customer segment or a specific product category. Cult brands deliver a sense of belonging between people who share the same culture and passions. Harley-Davidson is a typical example of cult brand because they effectively express open roads culture, free spirit mythology, and connotations of Hells Angels’ machismo. These ideas amass a following of the company's brand.

Other cult brands, often characterized by exclusive owners clubs and intensive social activities, are Ferrari, Ducati, Nautor Swan, Fender, Cohiba, and Breguet.[2]

Benign cults

Cult Brands fall into the category of benign cults which can be defined as a following where members are truly attached or intensely devoted to the product/service the brand provides. Benign Cults are not destructive and are welcoming of new members. In benign cults, human desires are fulfilled in a positive and unharmful way.

Defining factors 
A brand can be defined as a cult brand if the following factors are present:
 A superior level of customer loyalty is achieved 
 Brand loyalists perceive no true competitors to the brand as there are no substitutes for the "true" brand
 Customers receive a sense of ownership with the brand 
 Loyalty is sustained over time (as opposed to fads which are unsustainable and short-lived)
 Customers receive more than a product, they experience a lifestyle

Three stages of a cult brand 
There are considered to be three stages of followers within a brand:
 It starts with the ‘brand following’, continued by the ‘connectedness’, with the third and final stage being that of ‘consumer conformity’. Brand following can be described as consumers that share the same strong affiliation in a brand, create a bond or ‘relationship’ on the simple basis that they share a common interest. At this point, there is more emphasis on the brand itself with an underlying relationship between common consumers arising. 
 The second stage being that of connectedness, can be described as the brand users developing a further sense of togetherness while also initiating a stronger bond in the way that they display a sort of empathy towards one another. In this stage, users are now becoming more interested in other users, the culture of building a community, and the apparent bond that is forming within such a community. 
 The third and final stage of ‘consumer conformity’ suggests that there is no longer any real individual consumer, but a well formed group/population. It is said that people associate themselves with groups or other people to make sense of themselves or essentially to reach self-actualisation. Through doing so, one would feel a certain level of fulfilment that helps to energise a group, providing strength and loyalty to a brand. A good example of a strong brand community within a well-known cult brand is that of the ‘Hell’s Angels’. The Hell's Angels are so devoted to Harley Davidsons that it is said within their own wedding ceremonies they use the Harley owner's manual as a replacement for the bible.

Advantages

There are certainly many advantages to inducting your own brand into cult-like status, some of which add to company image, whereas others simply boost sales and revenue across the board. Well known advantages of having cult-like followers include perks such as: a loyal customer-base, low price sensitivity, improved competitiveness, and snowball advertising (Thompson, Scott A. and Rajiv K. Sinha, 2008). A loyal customer base means that through ‘thick and thin’, the consumer will stay by your side. A good example of this is when Nike, although being found out for exploiting cheap child labour in the Nike owned sweatshops, maintains a fanatical following from their loyal customer base. Another advantage previously mentioned is low price sensitivity. This means that consumers aren’t as conscious as to the price they are paying for their worshipped brand's goods. The consumers are able to pay more in a guilt-free manner without the need to shop for a cheaper and/or better alternative i.e. an elastic demand. The third mentioned advantage was that of the ‘improved competitiveness’ category. This means that as a result of a fanatical, loyal following, consumers see no real competition or substitute for their chosen brand/s. Linking back to low price sensitivity, consumers are willing to pay any price for the product and as a result, the companies do not partake in any sort of price war with competitors. The fourth and final mentioned advantage is ‘snowball advertising’. Here snowball advertising means that loyal customers spread word of praise for their chosen brand/s. Linking back to a “cultist recruitment stage” companies are able to let consumers broaden their demographic as people who hear positive word about a product are likely to go through at least one of the three cultist brand stages (Thompson, Scott A. and Rajiv K. Sinha, 2008).

Examples
The following emerged as cult brands because the brands sell lifestyles, whilst focusing a great deal on their customers.

Harley-Davidson
Harley-Davidson sells more than just motorcycles, it sells a passion and a lifestyle. The emergence of the Harley's Ownership Group or HOG was an opportunity for motorcycle enthusiasts to share experiences and passion for the sport
- a factor which turned them into a lifestyle brand. This cult brand is a textbook example of guerrilla marketing. Harley-Davidson benefited from word-of-mouth advertising and  relied on low-cost dealership promotions.

Vans
Vans is known for providing true skate culture. It markets itself as more than a company but a lifestyle. Very early on, Vans became actively involved in skate culture by hosting skateboarding days and sponsoring the famous Warped tour. Furthermore, in 2014, Vans opened a free-access skate complex in Huntington beach. Embracing skate culture to its fullest has brought Vans to prominence within skate society.

Lululemon
Lululemon is known for being far more than a simple spandex store. Whilst other brands built stores, Lululemon created a 'hub for healthy living'. Furthermore,  the company regularly run yoga classes and appoint ambassadors that truly represent the Lululemon brand. Their enthusiasm enabled Lululemon to create a lifestyle based on healthy living and health enthusiasts. Selling the lifestyle constituted to a brand that made high priced, $98 yoga pants merchantable.

Apple
Apple has become the epitome of cult branding. The brand has a strong corporate culture of listening and receiving feedback, especially from the consumer's perspective. Apple recognizes its customer's appreciate innovation and the aesthetics of things. Apple's annual Macworld expo which includes workshops where the latest Apple products are discussed in an open environment allows Apple to create innovative products that customers greatly desire. For instance, the introduction of the iPod was created in ways that intertwined with human lifestyles and day-to-day activities. Furthermore, Apple slogans such as 'think different' pinpointed human desires to be different and to be part of a society. The slogan was a true manifestation of individual identity.  The irony here, of course, is that the company has spent an enormous amount of energy to ensure the humans think identically when it comes to their choice in products.

Oprah
Cult brands do not confine to products or services provided by businesses. Cult brands may include influential people, for instance, celebrities. The Oprah Winfrey Show rapidly flourished into a cult brand in 1986. Oprah's topic of discussion and debate were of great interest to her audience, while her advice and recommendations were found highly influential. For example, Oprah's book recommendations helped many novels become best sellers. Furthermore, her endorsement of the former president of the United States, Barack Obama's presidential election in 2008 proved efficacious.

References

Brand management
Brands
Product management